The Battle of Palembang was a battle of the Pacific theatre of World War II. It occurred near Palembang, on Sumatra, on 13–15 February 1942. The Royal Dutch Shell oil refineries at nearby Plaju (then Pladjoe) were the major objectives for the Empire of Japan in the Pacific War, because of an oil embargo imposed on Japan by the United States, the Netherlands, and the United Kingdom after the Japanese invaded China and committed massive atrocities such as the rape of Nanking. With the area's abundant fuel supply and airfield, Palembang offered significant potential as a military base to both the Allies and the Japanese.

Prelude

In January, the American-British-Dutch-Australian Command (ABDACOM) decided to concentrate Allied air forces in Sumatra at two airfields near Palembang: Talang Betutu (then Talangbetoetoe), also known as "P1" and a secret air base at Prabumulih (then Praboemoelih), or "P2".

The British Royal Air Force created No. 225 (Bomber) Group at Palembang. It included two Royal Australian Air Force squadrons and a large number of Australians serving with British squadrons. The group could only muster 40 Bristol Blenheim light bombers and 35 Lockheed Hudson light bombers. The Blenheims had flown from the Middle East and Egypt, where they were considered too old to cope with newer German and Italian fighters. (A handful of United States Far East Air Force B-17 Flying Fortress heavy bombers also operated out of Palembang briefly in January, but these were withdrawn to Java and Australia before the battle commenced.)

No. 226 (Fighter) Group  RAF also arrived at Palembang in early February: two squadrons of Hawker Hurricanes transported to Sumatra by the aircraft carrier . They were joined by the remnants of British, Australian and Royal New Zealand Air Force Hurricane and Brewster Buffalo squadrons, which had both inflicted and suffered heavy losses in intense air battles over the Malayan and Singapore campaigns.

The Royal Netherlands East Indies Army (KNIL) South Sumatra Island Territorial Command, its command in the Palembang area, consisted of about 2,000 troops under Lieutenant Colonel L. N. W. Vogelesang: the South Sumatra Garrison Battalion and a Stadswacht/Landstorm ("home guard/reserve") infantry company in Palembang, a Stadswacht/Landstorm infantry company in Jambi (Djambi), as well as various artillery and machine gun units. (KNIL units in other parts of Sumatra lacked mobility and played no part in the fighting.) The Royal Netherlands Navy was represented by the minelayer Pro Patria and the patrol boats P-38 and P-40 on the Musi river.

Battle

Airborne attack

While the Allied planes attacked the Japanese ships on 13 February, Kawasaki Ki-56 transport planes of the 1st, 2nd and 3rd Chutai, Imperial Japanese Army Air Force (IJAAF), dropped Teishin Shudan (Raiding Group) paratroopers over Pangkalan Benteng airfield. At the same time Mitsubishi Ki-21 bombers from the 98th Sentai dropped supplies for paratroopers. The formation was escorted by a large force of Nakajima Ki-43 fighters from the 59th and 64th Sentai.

As many as 180 men from the Japanese 2nd Parachute Regiment, under Colonel Seiichi Kume, dropped between Palembang and Pangkalan Benteng, and more than 90 men came down west of the refineries at Pladjoe. Although the Japanese paratroopers failed to capture the Pangkalan Benteng airfield, they did manage to gain possession of the entire Pladjoe oil refinery complex undamaged. A makeshift counter-attack by Landstorm troops and anti-aircraft gunners from Praboemoelih managed to retake the complex but took heavy losses, due to Japanese soldiers entrenched in the refinery's air raid shelters. The planned demolition failed to do any serious damage to the refinery, but the oil stores were set ablaze. Two hours after the first drop, another 60 Japanese paratroopers were dropped near Pangkalan Benteng airfield.

On 14 February, the surviving Japanese paratroopers advanced to the Musi, Salang and Telang rivers, near Palembang.

Amphibious assault
The main Japanese invasion force, an amphibious assault fleet under Vice-Admiral Jisaburo Ozawa of the Imperial Japanese Navy (IJN), was on its way from Cam Ranh Bay in French Indochina. It was made up of the Imperial Japanese Army's 229th Infantry Regiment and one battalion from the 230th Infantry Regiment. A small advance party set out eight transports escorted by the light cruiser Sendai and four destroyers. The main force followed in 14 transports, escorted by the heavy cruiser Chokai and four destroyers. The covering force included the aircraft carrier Ryujo, four heavy cruisers, one light cruiser and three destroyers. Additional air cover was provided by land-based IJN planes and the IJAAF 3rd Air Division.

On the morning of 13 February, a river boat commandeered by the British Royal Navy, HMS Li Wo — under Lieutenant Thomas Wilkinson — ferrying personnel and equipment between Singapore and the Dutch East Indies, ran into the Japanese fleet. Although Li Wo was armed only with a 4-inch (100 mm) gun and two machineguns, its crew fired at the Japanese troop transport ships, setting one on fire and damaging several others, while under fire from the Japanese cruisers. This action continued for 90 minutes until the Li Wo ran out of ammunition. Wilkinson then ordered the ramming of the nearest transport, before his ship was destroyed by Japanese fire. Wilkinson received a posthumous Victoria Cross (VC), the highest award for gallantry in the British Commonwealth, and the only VC awarded in the Dutch East Indies campaign.

On 15 February, an ABDA naval force of five cruisers, HNLMS De Ruyter,  and HNLMS Tromp, HMAS Hobart and 10 destroyers, under Admiral Karel Doorman, made an abortive attempt to intercept the Japanese force. Planes from Ryujo and land-based aircraft made a series of attacks on the Allied ships, forcing them to withdraw to the south of Sumatra.

As the Japanese landing force approached Sumatra, the remaining Allied aircraft attacked it, and the Japanese transport ship Otawa Maru was sunk. Hurricanes flew up the rivers, machine-gunning Japanese landing craft.

However, on the afternoon of 15 February, all Allied aircraft were ordered to Java, where a major Japanese attack was anticipated, and the Allied air units had withdrawn from southern Sumatra by the evening of 16 February 1942. Other personnel were evacuated via Oosthaven (now Bandar Lampung) by ships to Java or India.

References

Conflicts in 1942
1942 in Indonesia
South West Pacific theatre of World War II
Palembang
Japanese occupation of the Dutch East Indies
Battles and operations of World War II involving the Netherlands
Battles of World War II involving Japan
Palembang
Battles of World War II involving Australia
Battles of World War II involving New Zealand
Airborne operations of World War II
Palembang
1942 in the Dutch East Indies
February 1942 events